News Free Zone was a 1985 Australian TV comedy show starring Grahame Bond. It was the idea of Maurice Murphy.

Premise
It was intended to be an entire evening's entertainment in one half hour with no news (shown at 6pm, the same time the three commercial networks showed their evening news). It screened daily.

The regular segments included:
a sitcom called Australia Street about a sharehouse at 85 Australia Street with a different resident from each state
a game show Neverending Story 
a one person soap opera Party Line
Kev Kevanagh's Kulture
World Championship Acting
Vintage Video which showed old sketches from Aunty Jack
a reading at the end from The Book Of Wisdom
Bond singing "Please Respect Me"

Cast
Grahame Bond
Rory O'Donoghue
Garry McDonald
Robyn Moase
John Derum
John Bluthal
Jude Kuring
Neil Redfern
Val Langford
Sandra MacGregor
Doug Scroope

Production
Murphy says the program was based on his "absolute hatred of anything journalistic and philosophical" and an "absolute love of enjoyment and fun and the light side in life". He says it was based on his "personal attention span. Some programs have one minute of plot and 27 minutes of fill in. I've always wondered why we just didn't have the minute and forget about the other 27 minutes."

Apart from Grahame Bond, there are no well-known faces in the cast. "The aim is to try and develop a program that doesn't have to come off," said Murphy. "The idea is just to have I fun. I hope News Free Zone builds up new faces."

It was filmed in Adelaide. The series ran on every weekday for ten weeks.

Reception
The show was the lead-in for the new ABC news program The National. Ratings were poor.

References

External links

News Free Zone at Nostalgia Central

Australian comedy television series
1985 Australian television series debuts
1986 Australian television series endings